Weigel's is a convenience store chain based in Powell, Tennessee with 68 locations in the East Tennessee region. They also own and operate Broadacre Dairy Inc, which processes milk, tea, juices, and eggnog for their convenience stores, as well as its own bakery, Red Barn Foods.

History 

The Weigel family entered the dairy business in 1931 with a "herd" of four cows on a 600-acre farm selling raw milk in 10-gallon cans. William Weigel Sr. began bottling pasteurized milk in 1935 and the company soon built a home delivery service.

In 1938, management of the operation passed completely to Lynn B. and William W. Weigel, both men having graduated from the University of Tennessee's School of Dairy Science. Lynn was in charge of the office and dairy operations and William was in charge of farm operations and marketing. In 1947, the new plant was modernized, and ice cream and cottage cheese production were added.

Primarily to provide an outlet for their returnable gallon milk jugs and other dairy products, the Weigel brothers opened drive-through stores in East Tennessee.  Store Number 1, on Sanderson Road in Knoxville, Tennessee, opened on December 9, 1958. Current CEO Billy Weigel expanded on that idea when he opened the company's first walk-in milk store, in 1964, which became one of the first convenience stores in Knoxville.

The company opened its own bakery, Red Barn Foods, in 2014. The 12,000-square-foot facility makes daily delivers of donuts, cookies and muffins to Weigel's locations throughout the region. The company is expanding on that fresh concept with Weigel's Kitchens inside some locations.

Between 1999 and 2015, Weigel's invested more than $120 million in new store builds, opening about 40 new and replacement locations.

Weigel's Milk 
In 1958, Weigel's introduced its Jug O’Milk brand. All Weigel's milk is produced at the Broadacre Dairy dairy farm in Powell, Tennessee. The milk is cold pasteurized the old-fashioned way, allowing it to retain a natural creamy flavor. Being a small and local dairy, the company's localized supply chain is able to bring the milk from farm-to-store within 24 hours.

Weigel's chocolate milk has won three Tennessee State Fair Blue Ribbon awards.

Locations
 Store #11 - 1700 Merchants Drive, Knoxville, TN 37912
 Store #12 - 5621 Oak Ridge Hwy, Knoxville, TN 37921
 Store #15 - 6927 Kingston Pike, Knoxville, TN 37919
 Store #18 - 7701 South Northshore Drive, Knoxville, TN 37919
 Store #20 - 2119 W Emory Rd, Powell, TN 37849
 Store #22 - 3900 Pleasant Ridge Road, Knoxville, TN 37912
 Store #23 - 328 N Cedar Bluff Rd, Knoxville, TN 37923
 Store #26 - 1500 Downtown W Blvd, Knoxville, TN 37919
 Store #27 - 7433 Maynardville Pike, Knoxville, TN 37938
 Store #29 - 6301 Lonas Drive, Knoxville, TN 37909
 Store #30 - 1000 N Cedar Bluff Rd, Knoxville, TN 37923
 Store #31 - 6532 Maynardville Pike, Knoxville, TN 37918
 Store #32 - 9148 Fox Lonas Rd, Knoxville, TN, 37923
 Store #33 - 9541 Kingston Pike, Knoxville, TN 37922
 Store #36 - 2385 Oak Ridge Turnpike, Oak Ridge, TN, 37830
 Store #37 - 11 E. Summit Hill Drive, Knoxville, TN, 37915
 Store #39 - 7420 Tazewell Pike, Corryton, TN, 37721
 Store #42 - 390 Hwy 321 North, Lenoir City, TN, 37771
 Store #43 - 4750 Middlebrook Pike, Knoxville, TN, 37921
 Store #44 - 12001 Kingston Pike, Knoxville, TN, 37934
 Store #45 - 7801 Oak Ridge Hwy , Knoxville, TN, 37921
 Store #46 - 3104 W John Sevier Hwy, Knoxville, TN, 37920
 Store #47 - 1325 N. Cherry Street, Knoxville, TN, 37914
 Store #48 - 7235 Strawberry Plains Pike, Knoxville, TN, 37914
 Store #49 - 8410 Middlebrook Pike, Knoxville, TN, 37923
 Store #50 - 2024 Topside Rd, Louisville, TN, 37777
 Store #51 - 6802 Central Ave Pike, Knoxville, TN, 37918
 Store #52 - 9710 Westland Dr, Knoxville, TN, 37922
 Store #53 - 1920 West Broadway, Maryville, TN, 37801
 Store #54 - 2031 Hwy 411, Vonore, TN, 37885
 Store #55 - 1506 East Emory Rd, Knoxville, TN, 37938
 Store #56 - 610 N Campbell Station Rd, Knoxville, TN, 37934
 Store #57 - 9301 S. Northshore Dr, Knoxville, TN, 37922
 Store #58 - 504 Gallaher Rd, Kingston, TN, 37763
 Store #59 - 331 East Emory Rd, Powell, TN, 37849
 Store #60 - 5904 Washington Pike, Knoxville, TN, 37918
 Store #61 - 657 Hwy 92 South, Dandridge, TN, 37725
 Store #62 - 12350 Hwy 72 North, Loudon, TN, 37774
 Store #63 - 9729 Middlebrook Pike, Knoxville, TN, 37931
 Store #64 - 2409 Charles G Seivers Blvd, Clinton, TN, 37716
 Store #65 - 2106 W Andrew Johnson Hwy, Morristown, TN, 37816
 Store #66 - 4567 Hwy 321, Lenoir City, TN, 37771
 Store #67 - 7514 Mountain Grove Dr, Knoxville, TN, 37920
 Store #68 - 2750 N Davy Crockett Pkwy, Morristown, TN, 37816
 Store #69 - 1512 Dolly Parton Pkwy, Sevierville, TN, 37862
 Store #70 - 12400 S. Northshore Dr, Knoxville, TN, 37922
 Store #71 - 10625 Hardin Valley Rd, Knoxville, TN, 37932
 Store #73 - 102 Weigel Lane, Rocky Top, TN, 37769
 Store #74 - 1405 Lovell Road, Knoxville, TN, 37932
 Store #75 - 105 Boyds Creek Hwy , Seymour, TN, 37865
 Store #76 - 6677 Peavine Road, Crossville, TN, 38571
 Store #77 - 143 W. Broadway Blvd, Jefferson City, TN, 37760
 Store #78 - 2105 Hwy 321, Maryville, TN, 37801
 Store #79 - 417 S. Illinois Ave, Oak Ridge, TN, 37830
 Store #80 - 910 Cosby Hwy, Newport, TN, 37821
 Store #81 - 5290 S. Davy Crockett Pkwy, Morristown, TN, 37813
 Store #82 - 2340 Clinton Hwy, Powell, TN, 37849
 Store #83 - 2403 Jacksboro Pike, LaFollette, TN, 37766
 Store #84 - 3939 Chapman Hwy, Knoxville, TN, 37920
 Store #85 - 2001 Roane State Hwy-Midtown, Harriman, TN, 37748
 Store #86 - 208 Hwy 68, Sweetwater, TN, 37874
 Store #87 - 1023 West Ave, Crossville, TN, 38555
 Store #88 - 3815 Western Ave, Knoxville, TN, 37921
 Store #89 - 7505 Clinton Hwy, Powell, TN, 37849
 Store #90 - 2865 Winfield Dunn Pkwy, Sevierville, TN, 37764
 Store #92 - 1150 Hunters Crossing Drive, Alcoa, TN, 37701
 Store #93 - 4401 West Stone Dr, Kingsport, TN, 37660
 Store #94 - 1416 Hwy 11W, Bristol, TN, 37620

References

External links
Official Website
Official History

Companies based in Knoxville, Tennessee
Convenience stores of the United States